In enzymology, a 2-(acetamidomethylene)succinate hydrolase is an enzyme that catalyzes the chemical reaction

2-(acetamidomethylene)succinate + 2 H2O  acetate + succinate semialdehyde + NH3 + CO2

Thus, the two substrates of this enzyme are 2-(acetamidomethylene)succinate and H2O, whereas its 4 products are acetate, succinate semialdehyde, NH3, and CO2.

This enzyme belongs to the family of hydrolases, those acting on carbon-nitrogen bonds other than peptide bonds, specifically in linear amides.  The systematic name of this enzyme class is 2-(acetamidomethylene)succinate amidohydrolase (deaminating, decarboxylating). This enzyme is also called alpha-(N-acetylaminomethylene)succinic acid hydrolase.  This enzyme participates in vitamin B6 metabolism.

References

 
 

EC 3.5.1
Enzymes of unknown structure